During the Second World War, the German Navy built over a thousand U-boats or submarines for service in the Battle of the Atlantic and elsewhere.  Although the majority of these had active service careers, and 784 of them were lost at sea, there were still several hundred boats which were never completed or completed too late to see any war service.  These boats were sometime solely commissioned as training craft, or were too badly damaged by bombing to be worth completion.  Most however were finished in the last six months of the war and never had time or enough fuel to complete their training programs.  These boats remained in German harbours up until April/May 1945, when most were taken out to sea by skeleton crews and scuttled to prevent the allies capturing them. The boats that were captured were taken by the Allies to Loch Ryan in Scotland and Lisahally in Northern Ireland.  Some were presented to allied navies for commissioning or experiments, but the majority of captured U-boats were towed out to sea in the autumn of 1945 and sunk by gunfire in Operation Deadlight.

Type: XIB
Construction
 Laid Down: 
 Launched: 
 Commissioned: 
 Shipyard: AG Weser, Bremen
Commander
 
 Fate: Construction suspended on September 15, 1939, and cancelled in May 1940. Some sources claim that the U-112 was completed and sailed against the US in 1945 and sunk there with all hands, but there is no evidence to support this claim.
 U-boat.net webpage for U-112

Type: XIB
Construction
 Laid Down: 
 Launched: 
 Commissioned: 
 Shipyard: AG Weser, Bremen
Commander
 
 Fate: Construction suspended on September 15, 1939, and cancelled in May 1940.
 U-boat.net webpage for U-113

Type: XIB
Construction
 Laid Down: 
 Launched: 
 Commissioned: 
 Shipyard: AG Weser, Bremen
Commander
 
 Fate: Construction suspended on September 15, 1939, and cancelled in May 1940.
 U-boat.net webpage for U-114

Type: XIB
Construction
 Laid Down: 
 Launched: 
 Commissioned: 
 Shipyard: AG Weser, Bremen
Commander
 
 Fate: Construction suspended on September 15, 1939, and cancelled in May 1940.
 U-boat.net webpage for U-115

Type: VIIC/41
Construction
 Laid Down: July 15, 1943
 Launched: 
 Commissioned: 
 Shipyard: Flender-Werke, Lübeck
Commander
 
 Fate: Cancelled on July 20, 1944, and broken up.
 U-boat.net webpage for U-329

Type: VIIC/41
Construction
 Laid Down: August 3, 1943
 Launched: 
 Commissioned: 
 Shipyard: Flender-Werke, Lübeck
Commander
 
 Fate: Cancelled on July 20, 1944, and broken up.
 U-boat.net webpage for U-330

Type: VIIC
Construction
 Laid Down: June 10, 1942
 Launched: July 16, 1943
 Commissioned: 
 Shipyard: Howaldtswerke, Kiel
Commander
 
 Fate: Bombed while being fitted out on July 29, 1943, and left unfinished.
 U-boat.net webpage for U-395

Type: VIIC
Construction
 Laid Down: December 18, 1941
 Launched: April 17, 1943
 Commissioned: 
 Shipyard: Deutsche Werft, Kiel
Commander
 
 Fate: Sunk by bombs during an air raid on May 14, 1943. It was raised and 95% repaired in 1945, but was scuttled on May 3, 1945.
 U-boat.net webpage for U-474

Type: XIV
Construction
 Laid Down: July 13, 1943
 Launched: 
 Commissioned: 
 Shipyard: Deutsche Werft, Kiel
Commander
 
 Fate: Was 75% complete when construction was halted in 1944. Further construction halted on September 23, 1944, and broken up. 
 U-boat.net webpage for U-491

Type: XIV
Construction
 Laid Down: August 21, 1943
 Launched: 
 Commissioned: 
 Shipyard: Deutsche Werft, Kiel
Commander
 
 Fate: Was 75% complete when construction was halted in 1944. Further construction halted on September 23, 1944, and broken up.
 U-boat.net webpage for U-492

Type: XIV
Construction
 Laid Down: September 25, 1943
 Launched: 
 Commissioned: 
 Shipyard: Deutsche Werft, Kiel
Commander
 
 Fate: Was 75% complete when construction was halted in 1944. Further construction halted on September 23, 1944, and broken up.
 U-boat.net webpage for U-493

Type: XIV
Construction
 Laid Down: November 1, 1943
 Launched: 
 Commissioned: 
 Shipyard: Germaniawerft, Kiel
Commander
 
 Fate: Construction cancelled September 23, 1944 and broken up.
 U-boat.net webpage for U-494

Type: XIV
Construction
 Laid Down: November 12, 1943
 Launched: 
 Commissioned: 
 Shipyard: Germaniawerft, Kiel
Commander
 
 Fate: Construction cancelled on September 23, 1944, and broken up.
 U-boat.net webpage for U-495

Type: XIV
Construction
 Laid Down: February 8, 1944
 Launched: 
 Commissioned: 
 Shipyard: Germaniawerft, Kiel
Commander
 
 Fate: Construction cancelled on September 23, 1944, and broken up.
 U-boat.net webpage for U-496

Type: XIV
Construction
 Laid Down: 1944
 Launched: 
 Commissioned: 
 Shipyard: Germaniawerft, Kiel
Commander
 
 Fate: Construction cancelled on September 23, 1944, and broken up.
 U-boat.net webpage for U-497

Type: VIIC
Construction
 Laid Down: March 4, 1943
 Launched: April 1944
 Commissioned: 
 Shipyard: Howaldtswerke, Kiel
Commander
 
 Fate: Never finished and scuttled in front of the Elbe II bunker in Hamburg on May 3, 1945.
 U-boat.net webpage for U-684

Type: VIIC
Construction
 Laid Down: March 8, 1943
 Launched: April 1944
 Commissioned: 
 Shipyard: Howaldtswerke, Kiel
Commander
 
 Fate: Never finished and scuttled in front of the Elbe II bunker in Hamburg on May 3, 1945.
 U-boat.net webpage for U-685

Type: VIIC
Construction
 Laid Down: May 13, 1943
 Launched: 
 Commissioned: 
 Shipyard: Howaldtswerke, Kiel
Commander
 
 Fate: Never finished. Cancelled on September 23, 1944.
 U-boat.net webpage for U-686

Type: VIIC/41
Construction
 Laid Down: May 13, 1943
 Launched: 
 Commissioned: 
 Shipyard: Howaldtswerke, Kiel
Commander
 
 Fate: Construction suspended on November 3, 1943, and cancelled on July 22, 1944.
 U-boat.net webpage for U-687

Type: VIIC/41
Construction
 Laid Down: July 12, 1943
 Launched: 
 Commissioned: 
 Shipyard: Howaldtswerke, Kiel
Commander
 
 Fate: Never finished. Construction suspended on September 30, 1943, and cancelled on July 22, 1944.
 U-boat.net webpage for U-688

Type: VIIC/41
Construction
 Laid Down: July 13, 1943
 Launched: 
 Commissioned: 
 Shipyard: Howaldtswerke, Kiel
Commander
 
 Fate: Never finished. Construction suspended on September 30, 1943, and cancelled on July 22, 1944.
 U-boat.net webpage for U-689

Type: VIIC/41
Construction
 Laid Down: June 9, 1943
 Launched: 
 Commissioned: 
 Shipyard: Stülcken-Werft, Hamburg
Commander
 
 Fate: Construction postponed on September 30, 1943, and never built.
 U-boat.net webpage for U-723

Type: VIIC/41
Construction
 Laid Down: July 25, 1943
 Launched: 
 Commissioned: 
 Shipyard: Stülcken-Werft, Hamburg
Commander
 
 Fate: Construction postponed on September 30, 1943, and never built.
 U-boat.net webpage for U-724

Type: VIIC
Construction
 Laid Down:
 Launched: 
 Commissioned: 
 Shipyard: Kriegsmarinewerft, Wilhelmshaven
Commander
 
 Fate: Damaged in an air raid (along with U-770) on January 27, 1943. Due to amount of damage the work number was transferred to another submarine and U-769 was reassigned a new work number. Construction suspended on September 30, 1943, and cancelled on July 22, 1944.
 U-boat.net webpage for U-769

Type: VIIC
Construction
 Laid Down:
 Launched: 
 Commissioned: 
 Shipyard: Kriegsmarinewerft, Wilhelmshaven
Commander
 
 Fate: Damaged in an air raid (along with U-769) on January 27, 1943. Due to amount of damage the werk number was transferred to another submarine and U-770 was reassigned a new werk number. Construction suspended on September 30, 1943, and cancelled on July 22, 1944.
 U-boat.net webpage for U-770

Type: VIIC
Construction
 Laid Down: August 25, 1943
 Launched: 
 Commissioned: 
 Shipyard: Kriegsmarinewerft, Wilhelmshaven
Commander
 
 Fate: Construction suspended on September 30, 1943, and cancelled on July 20, 1944.
 U-boat.net webpage for U-780

Type: VIIC
Construction
 Laid Down: September 30, 1943
 Launched: 
 Commissioned: 
 Shipyard: Kriegsmarinewerft, Wilhelmshaven
Commander
 
 Fate: Construction suspended on September 30, 1943, and cancelled on July 20, 1944.
 U-boat.net webpage for U-781

Type: VIIC
Construction
 Laid Down: Late 1943
 Launched: 
 Commissioned: 
 Shipyard: Kriegsmarinewerft, Wilhelmshaven
Commander
 
 Fate: Construction suspended on September 30, 1943, and cancelled on July 22, 1944.
 U-boat.net webpage for U-782

Type: V 300
Construction
 Laid Down: 
 Launched: 
 Commissioned: 
 Shipyard: Germaniawerft, Kiel
Commander
 
 Fate: Enlarged version of V 80, except with a conning tower. The only ship of this type, cancelled on August 7, 1942, in favor of other more promising Walter designs.
 U-boat.net webpage for U-791

Type: XVIIA
Construction
 Laid Down: December 1, 1942
 Launched: September 28, 1943
 Commissioned: November 16, 1943
 Shipyard: Blohm & Voss, Hamburg
Commander
 Horst Heitz
 Hans Diederich Huis
 Fate: Used for trials and later as a floating fuel bunker. Scuttled in the Audorfer See near Rendsburg on May 4, 1945. Raised on May 26, 1945, and taken to Britain as a war prize and used for trials, but was soon torn down for parts and scrapped. Final fate unknown.
 U-boat.net webpage for U-792

Type: XVIIA
Construction
 Laid Down: December 1, 1942
 Launched: September 28, 1943
 Commissioned: November 16, 1943
 Shipyard: Blohm & Voss, Hamburg
Commander
 Gunter Schauenburg
 Friedrich Schmidt
 Fate: Used for trials; scuttled in the Audorfer See near Rendsburg on May 4, 1945. Raised on May 26, 1945, and taken to Britain as a war prize and used for trials, but was torn down for parts and scrapped.
 U-boat.net webpage for U-793

Type: XVIII
Construction
 Laid Down: December 27, 1943
 Launched: 
 Commissioned: 
 Shipyard: Germaniawerft, Kiel
Commander
 
 Fate: Construction cancelled on March 27, 1944.
 U-boat.net webpage for U-796

Type: XVIII
Construction
 Laid Down: 
 Launched: 
 Commissioned: 
 Shipyard: Germaniawerft, Kiel
Commander
 
 Fate: Construction cancelled on March 27, 1944. Was never laid down.
 U-boat.net webpage for U-797

Type: XVIIK
Construction
 Laid Down: April 23, 1944
 Launched: 
 Commissioned: 
 Shipyard: Germaniawerft, Kiel
Commander
 
 Fate: Was still incomplete in May 1945.
 U-boat.net webpage for U-798

Type: IXC/40
Construction
 Laid Down: 1943
 Launched: 
 Commissioned: 
 Shipyard: Seebeckwerft, Bremen
Commander
 
 Fate: Construction suspended on September 30, 1943, and cancelled on July 22, 1944.
 U-boat.net webpage for U-807

Type: IXC/40
Construction
 Laid Down: 1943
 Launched: 
 Commissioned: 
 Shipyard: Seebeckwerft, Bremen
Commander
 
 Fate: Construction suspended on September 30, 1943, and cancelled on July 22, 1944.
 U-boat.net webpage for U-808

Type: IXC/40
Construction
 Laid Down: 
 Launched: 
 Commissioned: 
 Shipyard: Seebeckwerft, Bremen
Commander
 
 Fate: Construction suspended on September 30, 1943, and cancelled on July 22, 1944.
 U-boat.net webpage for U-809

Type: IXC/40
Construction
 Laid Down: 
 Launched: 
 Commissioned: 
 Shipyard: Seebeckwerft, Bremen
Commander
 
 Fate: Construction suspended on September 30, 1943, and cancelled on July 22, 1944.
 U-boat.net webpage for U-810

Type: IXC/40
Construction
 Laid Down:
 Launched: 
 Commissioned: 
 Shipyard: Seebeckwerft, Bremen
Commander
 
 Fate: Construction suspended on September 30, 1943, and cancelled on July 22, 1944.
 U-boat.net webpage for U-811

Type: IXC/40
Construction
 Laid Down:
 Launched: 
 Commissioned: 
 Shipyard: Seebeckwerft, Bremen
Commander
 
 Fate: Construction suspended on September 30, 1943, and cancelled on July 22, 1944.
 U-boat.net webpage for U-812

Type: IXC/40
Construction
 Laid Down: 
 Launched: 
 Commissioned: 
 Shipyard: Seebeckwerft, Bremen
Commander
 
 Fate: Construction suspended on September 30, 1943, and cancelled on November 6, 1943.
 U-boat.net webpage for U-813

Type: IXC/40
Construction
 Laid Down: 
 Launched: 
 Commissioned: 
 Shipyard: Seebeckwerft, Bremen
Commander
 
 Fate: Construction suspended on September 30, 1943, and cancelled on November 6, 1943.
 U-boat.net webpage for U-814

Type: IXC/40
Construction
 Laid Down: 
 Launched: 
 Commissioned: 
 Shipyard: Seebeckwerft, Bremen
Commander
 
 Fate: Construction suspended on September 30, 1943, and cancelled on November 6, 1943.
 U-boat.net webpage for U-815

Type: IXC/40
Construction
 Laid Down: 
 Launched: 
 Commissioned: 
 Shipyard: Seebeckwerft, Bremen
Commander
 
 Fate: Construction suspended on September 30, 1943, and cancelled on November 6, 1943.
 U-boat.net webpage for U-816

Type: VIIC
Construction
 Laid Down: November 11, 1941
 Launched: 
 Commissioned: 
 Shipyard: Oderwerke, Stettin
Commander
 
 Fate: Construction suspended on November 6, 1943. Cancelled on July 20, 1944, and left unfinished.
 U-boat.net webpage for U-823

Type: VIIC
Construction
 Laid Down: November 24, 1941
 Launched: 
 Commissioned: 
 Shipyard: Oderwerke, Stettin
Commander
 
 Fate: Construction suspended on November 6, 1943. Cancelled on July 20, 1944, and left unfinished.
 U-boat.net webpage for U-824

Type: IXC/40
Construction
 Laid Down: August 21, 1943
 Launched: April 29, 1944
 Commissioned: 
 Shipyard: AG Weser, Bremen
Commander
 
 Fate: Bombed in dock on March 30, 1945.
 U-boat.net webpage for U-882

Type: IXD/42
Construction
 Laid Down: August 29, 1943
 Launched: May 17, 1944
 Commissioned: 
 Shipyard: AG Weser, Bremen
Commander
 
 Fate: Badly damaged by an American bombing raid on March 30, 1945.
 U-boat.net webpage for U-884

Type: IXD/42
Construction
 Laid Down: 
 Launched: 
 Commissioned: 
 Shipyard: AG Weser, Bremen
Commander
 
 Fate: Construction suspended November 6, 1943 and cancelled July 22, 1944. Was not laid down.
 U-boat.net webpage for U-885

Type: IXD/42
Construction
 Laid Down: 
 Launched: 
 Commissioned: 
 Shipyard: AG Weser, Bremen
Commander
 
 Fate: Construction suspended November 6, 1943 and cancelled July 22, 1944. Was not laid down.
 U-boat.net webpage for U-886

Type: IXD/42
Construction
 Laid Down: 
 Launched: 
 Commissioned: 
 Shipyard: AG Weser, Bremen
Commander
 
 Fate: Construction suspended November 6, 1943 and cancelled July 22, 1944. Was not laid down.
 U-boat.net webpage for U-887

Type: IXD/42
Construction
 Laid Down: 
 Launched: 
 Commissioned: 
 Shipyard: AG Weser, Bremen
Commander
 
 Fate: Construction suspended November 6, 1943 and cancelled July 22, 1944. Was not laid down.
 U-boat.net webpage for U-888

Type: IXC/40
Construction
 Laid Down: September 20, 1943
 Launched: April 24, 1944
 Commissioned: 
 Shipyard: AG Weser, Bremen
Commander
 
 Fate: Sunk on July 29, 1944, while being fitted out. 
 U-boat.net webpage for U-890

Type: IXC/40
Construction
 Laid Down: October 11, 1943
 Launched: May 4, 1944
 Commissioned: 
 Shipyard: AG Weser, Bremen
Commander
 
 Fate: Sunk during an air raid on March 30, 1945, while being fitted out.
 U-boat.net webpage for U-891

Type: IXC/40
Construction
 Laid Down: October 23, 1943
 Launched: 
 Commissioned: 
 Shipyard: AG Weser, Bremen
Commander
 
 Fate: Construction suspended on September 23, 1944.
 U-boat.net webpage for U-892

Type: IXC/40
Construction
 Laid Down:
 Launched: 
 Commissioned: 
 Shipyard: AG Weser, Bremen
Commander
 
 Fate: Construction suspended on November 6, 1943, and cancelled on July 22, 1944.
 U-boat.net webpage for U-893

Type: IXC/40
Construction
 Laid Down:
 Launched: 
 Commissioned: 
 Shipyard: AG Weser, Bremen
Commander
 
 Fate: Construction suspended on November 6, 1943, and cancelled on July 22, 1944.
 U-boat.net webpage for U-894

Type: IXC/40
Construction
 Laid Down:
 Launched: 
 Commissioned: 
 Shipyard: AG Weser, Bremen
Commander
 
 Fate: Construction suspended on September 30, 1943, and cancelled on July 22, 1944.
 U-boat.net webpage for U-895

Type: IXC/40
Construction
 Laid Down:
 Launched: 
 Commissioned: 
 Shipyard: AG Weser, Bremen
Commander
 
 Fate: Construction suspended on September 30, 1943, and cancelled on July 22, 1944.
 U-boat.net webpage for U-896

Type: IXC/40
Construction
 Laid Down:
 Launched: 
 Commissioned: 
 Shipyard: AG Weser, Bremen
Commander
 
 Fate: Construction suspended on September 30, 1943, and cancelled on July 22, 1944.
 U-boat.net webpage for U-897

Type: IXC/40
Construction
 Laid Down:
 Launched: 
 Commissioned: 
 Shipyard: AG Weser, Bremen
Commander
 
 Fate: Construction suspended on November 6, 1943, and cancelled on July 22, 1944.
 U-boat.net webpage for U-898

Type: IXC/40
Construction
 Laid Down:
 Launched: 
 Commissioned: 
 Shipyard: AG Weser, Bremen
Commander
 
 Fate: Construction suspended on September 30, 1943, and cancelled on July 22, 1944.
 U-boat.net webpage for U-899

Type: IXD/42
Construction
 Laid Down:
 Launched: 
 Commissioned: 
 Shipyard: AG Weser, Bremen
Commander
 
 Fate: Construction suspended on September 30, 1943, and cancelled on November 6, 1943. Keel had not been laid down.
 U-boat.net webpage for U-900

Type: VIIC
Construction
 Laid Down: January 24, 1942
 Launched: December 24, 1943
 Commissioned: 
 Shipyard: Vulcan, Stettin
Commander
 
 Fate: Damaged twice by bombs, cancelled on July 22, 1944.
 U-boat.net webpage for U-902

Type: VIIC
Construction
 Laid Down: February 27, 1943
 Launched: April 1, 1944
 Commissioned: 
 Shipyard: Stülcken-Werft, Hamburg
Commander
 
 Fate: Sunk during an air raid on December 31, 1944, and left unfinished.
 U-boat.net webpage for U-906

Type: VIIC
Construction
 Laid Down: May 3, 1943
 Launched: 
 Commissioned: 
 Shipyard: Stülcken-Werft, Hamburg
Commander
 
 Fate: Damaged by bombs and left unfinished.
 U-boat.net webpage for U-908

Type: VIIC/41
Construction
 Laid Down: June 26, 1943
 Launched: 
 Commissioned: 
 Shipyard: Neptun-Werft AG, Rostock
Commander
 
 Fate: Was 40% complete when it was cancelled on September 23, 1944, and broken up.
 U-boat.net webpage for U-931

Type: VIIC/41
Construction
 Laid Down: August 21, 1943
 Launched: 
 Commissioned: 
 Shipyard: Neptun-Werft AG, Rostock
Commander
 
 Fate: Was 35% complete when it was cancelled on September 23, 1944, and broken up.
 U-boat.net webpage for U-932

Type: VIIC/41
Construction
 Laid Down: November 25, 1942
 Launched: July 22, 1943
 Commissioned: 
 Shipyard: Blohm & Voss, Hamburg
Commander
 
 Fate: Sunk at dock in August 1944.
 U-boat.net webpage for U-996

Type: VIIC/41
Construction
 Laid Down: March 12, 1943
 Launched: 
 Commissioned: 
 Shipyard: Blohm & Voss, Hamburg
Commander
 
 Fate: Damaged during an RAF raid on July 25, 1943; repair work cancelled on July 22, 1944.
 U-boat.net webpage for U-1011

Type: VIIC/41
Construction
 Laid Down: March 11, 1943
 Launched: 
 Commissioned: 
 Shipyard: Blohm & Voss, Hamburg
Commander
 
 Fate: Damaged during an RAF raid on July 25, 1943; repair work cancelled on July 22, 1944.
 U-boat.net webpage for U-1012

Type: VIIC/41
Construction
 Laid Down: June 3, 1943
 Launched: May 25, 1944
 Commissioned: 
 Shipyard: Blohm & Voss, Hamburg
Commander
 
 Fate: Never finished, scuttled in May 1945.
 U-boat.net webpage for U-1026

Type: VIIC/41
Construction
 Laid Down: June 17, 1943
 Launched: November 27, 1944
 Commissioned: 
 Shipyard: Blohm & Voss, Hamburg
Commander
 
 Fate: Never finished, scuttled in May 1945.
 U-boat.net webpage for U-1027

Type: VIIC/41
Construction
 Laid Down: June 17, 1943
 Launched: November 28, 1944
 Commissioned: 
 Shipyard: Blohm & Voss, Hamburg
Commander
 
 Fate: Never finished, scuttled in May 1945.
 U-boat.net webpage for U-1028

Type: VIIC/41
Construction
 Laid Down: June 18, 1943
 Launched: July 5, 1944
 Commissioned: 
 Shipyard: Blohm & Voss, Hamburg
Commander
 
 Fate: Never finished, scuttled in May 1945.
 U-boat.net webpage for U-1029

Type: VIIC/41
Construction
 Laid Down: June 28, 1943
 Launched: July 5, 1944
 Commissioned: 
 Shipyard: Blohm & Voss, Hamburg
Commander
 
 Fate: Never finished, scuttled in May 1945.
 U-boat.net webpage for U-1030

Type: VIIC/41
Construction
 Laid Down: July 12, 1943
 Launched: 
 Commissioned: 
 Shipyard: Blohm & Voss, Hamburg
Commander
 
 Fate: Construction suspended on September 30, 1943. Cancelled on July 22, 1944, and broken up.
 U-boat.net webpage for U-1031

Type: VIIC/41
Construction
 Laid Down: July 12, 1943
 Launched: 
 Commissioned: 
 Shipyard: Blohm & Voss, Hamburg
Commander
 
 Fate: Construction suspended on September 30, 1943. Cancelled on July 22, 1944, and broken up.
 U-boat.net webpage for U-1032

Type: VIIC/41
Construction
 Laid Down: September 20, 1943
 Launched: September 5, 1944
 Commissioned: November 18, 1944
 Shipyard: Nordseewerken, Emden
Commander
 Wolf Wigand
 Fate: Surrendered at Horten, Norway on May 9, 1945. Transferred to Lisahally, Northern Ireland on May 27, 1945. Acquired by Britain and became a British N-class submarine.
 U-boat.net webpage for U-1108

Type: VIIC/41
Construction
 Laid Down: April 27, 1943
 Launched: 
 Commissioned: 
 Shipyard: Howaldtswerke, Kiel
Commander
 
 Fate: Construction suspended on September 30, 1943, and cancelled on July 22, 1944.
 U-boat.net webpage for U-1133

Type: VIIC/41
Construction
 Laid Down: April 30, 1943
 Launched: 
 Commissioned: 
 Shipyard: Howaldtswerke, Kiel
Commander
 
 Fate: Construction suspended on September 30, 1943, and cancelled on July 22, 1944.
 U-boat.net webpage for U-1134

Type: VIIC/41
Construction
 Laid Down: June 24, 1943
 Launched: 
 Commissioned: 
 Shipyard: Howaldtswerke, Kiel
Commander
 
 Fate: Construction suspended on September 30, 1943, and cancelled on July 22, 1944.
 U-boat.net webpage for U-1135

Type: VIIC/41
Construction
 Laid Down: June 24, 1943
 Launched: 
 Commissioned: 
 Shipyard: Howaldtswerke, Kiel
Commander
 
 Fate: Construction suspended on September 30, 1943, and cancelled on July 22, 1944.
 U-boat.net webpage for U-1136

Type: VIIC/41
Construction
 Laid Down: May 5, 1943
 Launched: November 23, 1943
 Commissioned: March 22, 1944
 Shipyard: Danziger Werft, Danzig
Commander
 Otto-Heinrich Nachtigall
 Hermann Koopmann
 Fate: Surrendered at Stavanger, Norway on May 10, 1945. Transferred to Lisahally, Northern Ireland on May 27, 1945. Acquired by Britain and became British N-class submarine N19.
 U-boat.net webpage for U-1171

Type: VIIC/41
Construction
 Laid Down: May 22, 1943
 Launched: December 18, 1943
 Commissioned: 
 Shipyard: Schichau-Werke, Danzig
Commander
 
 Fate: Construction stopped on December 18, 1943, and left unfinished.
 U-boat.net webpage for U-1173

Type: VIIC/41
Construction
 Laid Down: June 25, 1943
 Launched: October 28, 1943
 Commissioned: 
 Shipyard: Schichau-Werke, Danzig
Commander
 
 Fate: Construction stopped on September 23, 1944, after contract was cancelled. Laid up incomplete in Danzig, captured unfinished by the Soviets on March 30, 1945, and launched at Danzig in mid-1945. Towed to Latvia where it was inspected by the TNC at Libau on October 8, 1945, still incomplete. Probably moved to Kronstadt in late 1945 or early 1946 and scrapped in 1947-1948.
 U-boat.net webpage for U-1174

Type: VIIC/41
Construction
 Laid Down: July 2, 1943
 Launched: October 28, 1943
 Commissioned: 
 Shipyard: Schichau-Werke, Danzig
Commander
 
 Fate: Construction stopped on October 28, 1943, and left unfinished. Cancelled on September 23, 1944.
 U-boat.net webpage for U-1175

Type: VIIC/41
Construction
 Laid Down: July 29, 1943
 Launched: November 6, 1943
 Commissioned: 
 Shipyard: Schichau-Werke, Danzig
Commander
 
 Fate: Construction stopped on September 23, 1944, after contract was cancelled. Laid up incomplete in Danzig, captured unfinished by the Soviets on March 30, 1945, and launched at Danzig in mid-1945. Towed to Latvia where it was inspected by the TNC at Libau on October 8, 1945, still incomplete and with a jammed rudder. Probably moved to Kronstadt in late 1945 or early 1946 and scrapped in 1947-1948.
 U-boat.net webpage for U-1176

Type: VIIC/41
Construction
 Laid Down: August 7, 1943
 Launched: 
 Commissioned: 
 Shipyard: Schichau-Werke, Danzig
Commander
 
 Fate: Construction suspended on November 6, 1943, but resumed until launching. Construction stopped on July 22, 1944, after contract was cancelled. Laid up incomplete at Kaiser Basin, Danzig, captured unfinished by the Soviets on March 30, 1945, and launched at Danzig in mid-1945. Towed to Latvia where it was inspected by the TNC at Libau on October 8, 1945, still incomplete and with shrapnel damage. Probably moved to Kronstadt in late 1945 or early 1946 and scrapped in 1947-1948.
 U-boat.net webpage for U-1177

Type: VIIC/41
Construction
 Laid Down: September 9, 1943
 Launched: 
 Commissioned: 
 Shipyard: Schichau-Werke, Danzig
Commander
 
 Fate: Construction suspended on November 6, 1943, and cancelled on July 22, 1944.
 U-boat.net webpage for U-1178

Type: VIIC/41
Construction
 Laid Down: September 22, 1943
 Launched: 
 Commissioned: 
 Shipyard: Schichau-Werke, Danzig
Commander
 
 Fate: Construction suspended on November 6, 1943, and cancelled on July 22, 1944.
 U-boat.net webpage for U-1179

Type: VIIC
Construction
 Laid Down: March 13, 1943
 Launched: September 30, 1943
 Commissioned: December 2, 1943
 Shipyard: Schichau-Werke, Danzig
Commander
 Heinz Baum
 Kurt Lau
 Fate: Decommissioned at Wesermünde on April 25, 1945, after suffering severe damage during a US air raid at AG Weser shipyard at Bremen on March 30, 1945. Captured at Wesermünde by British forces in May 1945. Sunk in the North Sea by the US Navy in February 1946.
 U-boat.net webpage for U-1197

Type: IXC/40
Construction
 Laid Down: June 7, 1943
 Launched: February 7, 1944
 Commissioned: 
 Shipyard: Deutsche Werft AG, Hamburg
Commander
 
 Fate: Construction abandoned in 1944 and suspended on September 23, 1944. Scuttled in the Hansa Basin, Hamburg on May 3, 1945. Raised in June or August 1945 and broken up.
 U-boat.net webpage for U-1236

Type: IXC/40
Construction
 Laid Down: June 22, 1943
 Launched: February 22, 1944
 Commissioned: 
 Shipyard: Deutsche Werft AG, Hamburg
Commander
 
 Fate: 
 U-boat.net webpage for U-1237

Type: IXC/40
Construction
 Laid Down: July 6, 1943
 Launched: March 16, 1944
 Commissioned: 
 Shipyard: Deutsche Werft AG, Hamburg
Commander
 
 Fate: 
 U-boat.net webpage for U-1238

Type: IXC/40
Construction
 Laid Down: July 20, 1943
 Launched: 
 Commissioned: 
 Shipyard: Deutsche Werft AG, Hamburg
Commander
 
 Fate: 
 U-boat.net webpage for U-1239

Type: IXC/40
Construction
 Laid Down: August 21, 1943
 Launched: 
 Commissioned: 
 Shipyard: Deutsche Werft AG, Hamburg
Commander
 
 Fate: 
 U-boat.net webpage for U-1240

Type: IXC/40
Construction
 Laid Down: September 29, 1943
 Launched: 
 Commissioned: 
 Shipyard: Deutsche Werft AG, Hamburg
Commander
 
 Fate: 
 U-boat.net webpage for U-1241

Type: IXC/40
Construction
 Laid Down: October 1943
 Launched: 
 Commissioned: 
 Shipyard: Deutsche Werft AG, Hamburg
Commander
 
 Fate: 
 U-boat.net webpage for U-1242

Type: IXC/40
Construction
 Laid Down: 
 Launched: 
 Commissioned: 
 Shipyard: Deutsche Werft AG, Hamburg
Commander
 
 Fate: Cancelled on September 23, 1943.
 U-boat.net webpage for U-1243

Type: IXC/40
Construction
 Laid Down: 
 Launched: 
 Commissioned: 
 Shipyard: Deutsche Werft AG, Hamburg
Commander
 
 Fate: Cancelled on September 23, 1943.
 U-boat.net webpage for U-1244

Type: IXC/40
Construction
 Laid Down: 
 Launched: 
 Commissioned: 
 Shipyard: Deutsche Werft AG, Hamburg
Commander
 
 Fate: Construction suspended September 30, 1943 and cancelled July 22, 1944.
 U-boat.net webpage for U-1245

Type: IXC/40
Construction
 Laid Down: 
 Launched: 
 Commissioned: 
 Shipyard: Deutsche Werft AG, Hamburg
Commander
 
 Fate: Construction suspended September 30, 1943 and cancelled July 22, 1944.
 U-boat.net webpage for U-1246

Type: IXC/40
Construction
 Laid Down: 
 Launched: 
 Commissioned: 
 Shipyard: Deutsche Werft AG, Hamburg
Commander
 
 Fate: Construction suspended September 30, 1943 and cancelled July 22, 1944.
 U-boat.net webpage for U-1247

Type: IXC/40
Construction
 Laid Down: 
 Launched: 
 Commissioned: 
 Shipyard: Deutsche Werft AG, Hamburg
Commander
 
 Fate: Construction suspended September 30, 1943 and cancelled July 22, 1944.
 U-boat.net webpage for U-1248

Type: IXC/40
Construction
 Laid Down: 
 Launched: 
 Commissioned: 
 Shipyard: Deutsche Werft AG, Hamburg
Commander
 
 Fate: Construction suspended September 30, 1943 and cancelled July 22, 1944.
 U-boat.net webpage for U-1249

Type: IXC/40
Construction
 Laid Down: 
 Launched: 
 Commissioned: 
 Shipyard: Deutsche Werft AG, Hamburg
Commander
 
 Fate: Construction suspended September 30, 1943 and cancelled July 22, 1944.
 U-boat.net webpage for U-1250

Type: IXC/40
Construction
 Laid Down: 
 Launched: 
 Commissioned: 
 Shipyard: Deutsche Werft AG, Hamburg
Commander
 
 Fate: Construction suspended September 30, 1943 and cancelled November 6, 1943.
 U-boat.net webpage for U-1251

Type: IXC/40
Construction
 Laid Down: 
 Launched: 
 Commissioned: 
 Shipyard: Deutsche Werft AG, Hamburg
Commander
 
 Fate: Construction suspended September 30, 1943 and cancelled November 6, 1943.
 U-boat.net webpage for U-1252

Type: IXC/40
Construction
 Laid Down: 
 Launched: 
 Commissioned: 
 Shipyard: Deutsche Werft AG, Hamburg
Commander
 
 Fate: Construction suspended September 30, 1943 and cancelled November 6, 1943.
 U-boat.net webpage for U-1253

Type: IXC/40
Construction
 Laid Down: 
 Launched: 
 Commissioned: 
 Shipyard: Deutsche Werft AG, Hamburg
Commander
 
 Fate: Construction suspended September 30, 1943 and cancelled November 6, 1943.
 U-boat.net webpage for U-1254

Type: IXC/40
Construction
 Laid Down: 
 Launched: 
 Commissioned: 
 Shipyard: Deutsche Werft AG, Hamburg
Commander
 
 Fate: Construction suspended September 30, 1943 and cancelled November 6, 1943.
 U-boat.net webpage for U-1255

Type: VIIC/41
Construction
 Laid Down: September 17, 1943
 Launched: 
 Commissioned: 
 Shipyard: Bremer Vulkan, Bremen-Vegesack
Commander
 
 Fate: Was 50-60% complete when it was cancelled on September 23, 1944.
 U-boat.net webpage for U-1280

Type: VIIC/41
Construction
 Laid Down: September 17, 1943
 Launched: 
 Commissioned: 
 Shipyard: Bremer Vulkan, Bremen-Vegesack
Commander
 
 Fate: Was 50-60% complete when it was cancelled on September 23, 1944.
 U-boat.net webpage for U-1281

Type: VIIC/41
Construction
 Laid Down: October 20, 1943
 Launched: 
 Commissioned: 
 Shipyard: Bremer Vulkan, Bremen-Vegesack
Commander
 
 Fate: Was 50-60% complete when it was cancelled on September 23, 1944.
 U-boat.net webpage for U-1282

Type: XVIIB
Construction
 Laid Down: October 30, 1943
 Launched: January 2, 1945
 Commissioned: February 8, 1945
 Shipyard: Blohm & Voss, Hamburg
Commander
 Werner Klug
 Fate: Surrendered at Cuxhaven, Germany on May 5, 1945. Scuttled along with U-1407 by Oblt. Gerhard Grumpelt against orders on May 7, 1945. Later raised and taken to the US on the deck of transport vessel Shoemaker, arriving at Portsmouth on October 11. Was never repaired or put into service by the US Navy. Sold for scrap in New York in May 1948 to Interstate Metals Corporation and broken up.
 U-boat.net webpage for U-1406

Type: XVIIB
Construction
 Laid Down: November 13, 1943
 Launched: 
 Commissioned: March 13, 1945
 Shipyard: Blohm & Voss, Hamburg
Commander
 Horst Heitz
 Fate: Surrendered at Cuxhaven, Germany on May 5, 1945. Scuttled along with U-1406 by Gerhard Grumpelt against orders on May 7, 1945. Later raised and taken to Britain as a war prize and became British N-class submarine N25 and later HMS Meteorite.
 U-boat.net webpage for U-1407

Type: XVIIB
Construction
 Laid Down: November 27, 1943
 Launched: 
 Commissioned: 
 Shipyard: Blohm & Voss, Hamburg
Commander
 
 Fate: Damaged in air raid on March 30, 1945, and scuttled at yard before completion.
 U-boat.net webpage for U-1408

Type: XVIIB
Construction
 Laid Down: December 15, 1943
 Launched: 
 Commissioned: 
 Shipyard: Blohm & Voss, Hamburg
Commander
 
 Fate: Damaged in air raid on March 30, 1945, and scuttled at yard before completion.
 U-boat.net webpage for U-1409

Type: XVIIB
Construction
 Laid Down: December 31, 1943
 Launched: 
 Commissioned: 
 Shipyard: Blohm & Voss, Hamburg
Commander
 
 Fate: Damaged in air raid on March 30, 1945, and scuttled at yard before completion.
 U-boat.net webpage for U-1410

Type: XIV
Construction
 Laid Down: 
 Launched: 
 Commissioned: 
 Shipyard: Germaniawerft, Kiel
Commander
 
 Fate: Construction suspended on June 3, 1944, and cancelled September 23, 1944.
 U-boat.net webpage for U-2201

Type: XIV
Construction
 Laid Down: 
 Launched: 
 Commissioned: 
 Shipyard: Germaniawerft, Kiel
Commander
 
 Fate: Construction suspended on June 3, 1944, and cancelled September 23, 1944.
 U-boat.net webpage for U-2202

Type: XIV
Construction
 Laid Down: 
 Launched: 
 Commissioned: 
 Shipyard: Germaniawerft, Kiel
Commander
 
 Fate: Construction suspended on June 3, 1944, and cancelled September 23, 1944.
 U-boat.net webpage for U-2203

Type: XIV
Construction
 Laid Down: 
 Launched: 
 Commissioned: 
 Shipyard: Germaniawerft, Kiel
Commander
 
 Fate: Construction suspended on June 3, 1944, and cancelled September 23, 1944.
 U-boat.net webpage for U-2204

Type: XXIII
Construction
 Laid Down: April 11, 1944
 Launched: May 31, 1944
 Commissioned: July 18, 1944
 Shipyard: Deutsche Werft, Hamburg
Commander
 Walter Angermann
 Fate: Sank off Möltenort by a mine on July 26, 1944, on her maiden voyage, killing two crew. Raised in early 1945 and was still under repairs when Germany surrendered. Broken up in place after WWII.
 U-boat.net webpage for U-2323

Type: XXIII
Construction
 Laid Down: May 16, 1944
 Launched: July 29, 1944
 Commissioned: August 19, 1944
 Shipyard: Deutsche Werft, Hamburg
Commander
 Heinrich Mürl
 Werner Müller
 Hans-Walter Pahl
 Hermann Schulz
 Fate: Scuttled at Kiel on May 2, 1945, as part of Operation Regenbogen. Later raised and broken up.
 U-boat.net webpage for U-2327

Type: XXIII
Construction
 Laid Down: June 30, 1944
 Launched: August 22, 1944
 Commissioned: September 12, 1944
 Shipyard: Deutsche Werft, Hamburg
Commander
 Hans-Walter Pahl
 Fate: Sank by accident near Hela, killing 15 crew. Later raised and towed to Gotenhafen (now Gdynia) and broken up for scrap.
 U-boat.net webpage for U-2331

Type: XXIII
Construction
 Laid Down: September 20, 1944
 Launched: October 18, 1944
 Commissioned: November 13, 1944
 Shipyard: Friedrich Krupp Germaniawerft, Kiel
Commander
 Dieter Bornkessel
 Fate: Scuttled at Hamburg on May 3, 1945, as part of Operation Regenbogen. Later raised and broken up.
 U-boat.net webpage for U-2332

Type: XXIII
Construction
 Laid Down: September 27, 1944
 Launched: November 16, 1944
 Commissioned: December 18, 1944
 Shipyard: Friedrich Krupp Germaniawerft, Kiel
Commander
 Heinz Baumann
 Fate: Scuttled in Gelting Bay on May 3, 1945, as part of Operation Regenbogen. Later raised and broken up.
 U-boat.net webpage for U-2333

Type: XXIII
Construction
 Laid Down: August 2, 1944
 Launched: September 15, 1944
 Commissioned: October 4, 1944
 Shipyard: Deutsche Werft, Hamburg
Commander
 Günter Behnisch
 Fate: Surrendered at Kristiansand Süd, Norway on May 9, 1945. Transferred to Loch Ryan, Scotland on May 29, 1945. Sunk by gunfire from British destroyer HMS Onslow and Polish destroyer ORP Piorun on November 28, 1945, as part of Operation Deadlight.
 U-boat.net webpage for U-2337

Type: XXIII
Construction
 Laid Down: August 10, 1944
 Launched: September 18, 1944
 Commissioned: October 9, 1944
 Shipyard: Deutsche Werft, Hamburg
Commander
 Hans-Dietrich Kaiser
 Fate: Sunk by RAF British Beaufighters of 236 Squadron and 254 Squadron on May 4, 1945, killing 12 crew. Raised in 1952 and broken up.
 U-boat.net webpage for U-2338

Type: XXIII
Construction
 Laid Down: August 18, 1944
 Launched: September 28, 1944
 Commissioned: October 16, 1944
 Shipyard: Deutsche Werft, Hamburg
Commander
 Emil Klusmeier
 Fate: Sunk at Hamburg during a British bombing run on March 30, 1945. Later raised and broken up.
 U-boat.net webpage for U-2340

Type: XXIII
Construction
 Laid Down: August 23, 1944
 Launched: October 3, 1944
 Commissioned: October 21, 1944
 Shipyard: Deutsche Werft, Hamburg
Commander
 Hermann Böhm
 Fate: Surrendered at Cuxhaven, Germany on May 5, 1945. Transferred to Lisahally, Northern Ireland on June 21, 1945. Sunk by gunfire from British destroyer HMS Onslaught and Polish destroyer ORP Błyskawica on December 31, 1945, as part of Operation Deadlight.
 U-boat.net webpage for U-2341

Type: XXIII
Construction
 Laid Down: August 29, 1944
 Launched: October 13, 1944
 Commissioned: November 1, 1944
 Shipyard: Deutsche Werft, Hamburg
Commander
 Berchthold Schad von Mittelbiberach
 Fate: Sunk in the Baltic Sea north of Swinemünde by a mine on December 20, 1944, killing seven crew. Wreck still in place in August 1953 and blown up in late October or November 1954. Remainder off wreck taken ashore and broken up for scrap.
 U-boat.net webpage for U-2342

Type: XXIII
Construction
 Laid Down: August 31, 1944
 Launched: October 18, 1944
 Commissioned: November 6, 1944
 Shipyard: Deutsche Werft, Hamburg
Commander
 Harald Fuhlendorf
 Hans-Ludwig Gaude
 Fate: Scuttled in or near Gelting Bay on May 5, 1945, as part of Operation Regenbogen. Later raised and broken up.
 U-boat.net webpage for U-2343

Type: XXIII
Construction
 Laid Down: September 4, 1944
 Launched: October 24, 1944
 Commissioned: November 10, 1944
 Shipyard: Deutsche Werft, Kiel
Commander
 Hermann Ellerlage
 Fate: Sank north of Heiligendamm on February 18, 1945, following a collision with U-2336, killing 10 crew. Raised on January 22, 1955, and taken to Rostock, measured and conserved, but never repaired. Broken up at Rostock in 1958.
 U-boat.net webpage for U-2344

Type: XXIII
Construction
 Laid Down: September 7, 1944
 Launched: October 28, 1944
 Commissioned: November 15, 1944
 Shipyard: Deutsche Werft, Hamburg
Commander
 Karl Steffen
 Fate: Surrendered at Stavanger, Norway on May 9, 1945. Transferred to Loch Ryan, Scotland on June 30, 1945. Towed out and scuttled on November 27, 1945, as part of Operation Deadlight.
 U-boat.net webpage for U-2345

Type: XXIII
Construction
 Laid Down: September 14, 1944
 Launched: October 31, 1944
 Commissioned: November 20, 1944
 Shipyard: Deutsche Werft, Hamburg
Commander
 Hermann von der Höh
 Fate: Scuttled in Gelting Bay on May 5, 1945, as part of Operation Regenbogen. Later raised and broken up.
 U-boat.net webpage for U-2346

Type: XXIII
Construction
 Laid Down: September 20, 1944
 Launched: November 6, 1944
 Commissioned: December 2, 1944
 Shipyard: Deutsche Werft, Hamburg
Commander
 Willibald Ulbing
 Fate: Scuttled in Gelting Bay on May 5, 1945, as part of Operation Regenbogen. Later raised and broken up.
 U-boat.net webpage for U-2347

Type: XXIII
Construction
 Laid Down: September 22, 1944
 Launched: November 11, 1944
 Commissioned: December 4, 1944
 Shipyard: Deutsche Werft, Hamburg
Commander
 Willibald Ulbing
 Fate: Surrendered at Stavanger, Norway on May 9, 1945. Transferred to Loch Ryan on May 27, 1945. Broken up at Belfast in April 1949.
 U-boat.net webpage for U-2348

Type: XXIII
Construction
 Laid Down: September 25, 1944
 Launched: November 20, 1944
 Commissioned: December 11, 1944
 Shipyard: Deutsche Werft, Hamburg
Commander
 Hans-Georg Müller
 Fate: Scuttled in Gelting Bay on May 5, 1945, as part of Operation Regenbogen. Later raised and broken up.
 U-boat.net webpage for U-2349

Type: XXIII
Construction
 Laid Down: September 28, 1944
 Launched: November 22, 1944
 Commissioned: December 23, 1944
 Shipyard: Deutsche Werft, Hamburg
Commander
 Werner Schauer
 Fate: Surrendered at Kristiansand Süd, Norway on May 9, 1945. Transferred to Loch Ryan, Scotland on May 29, 1945. Sunk by gunfire from British destroyer HMS Onslow and Polish destroyer ORP Piorun on November 28, 1945, as part of Operation Deadlight.
 U-boat.net webpage for U-2350

Type: XXIII
Construction
 Laid Down: September 28, 1944
 Launched: November 22, 1944
 Commissioned: December 23, 1944
 Shipyard: Deutsche Werft, Hamburg
Commander
 Werner Brückner
 Fate: Surrendered at Flensburg, Germany on May 5, 1945. Later transferred to Lisahally, Northern Ireland. Sunk by gunfire from British destroyer HMS Offa on January 3, 1946, as part of Operation Deadlight.
 U-boat.net webpage for U-2351

Type: XXIII
Construction
 Laid Down: October 3, 1944
 Launched: November 25, 1944
 Commissioned: December 30, 1944
 Shipyard: Deutsche Werft, Hamburg
Commander
 Sigmund Budzyn
 Fate: Scuttled at Hørav Hav, Denmark on May 5, 1945, as part of Operation Regenbogen. Later raised and broken up.
 U-boat.net webpage for U-2352

Type: XXIII
Construction
 Laid Down: October 10, 1944
 Launched: December 6, 1944
 Commissioned: January 9, 1945
 Shipyard: Deutsche Werft, Hamburg
Commander
 Jürgen Hillmann
 Fate: Surrendered at Kristiansand Süd, Norway on May 9, 1945. Transferred to Loch Ryan, Scotland on May 29, 1945. Allocated to the Soviet Union by the TNC. Arrived at Libau, Latvia on December 4, 1945, as British N-class N31. Allocated to the Soviet Baltic Fleet on February 13, 1946. Renamed M-51 on June 9, 1949, and transferred to reserve fleet as a training hulk on December 22, 1950. Struck from Soviet Navy list on March 17, 1952, and broken up for scrap in 1963. 
 U-boat.net webpage for U-2353

Type: XXIII
Construction
 Laid Down: October 14, 1944
 Launched: December 10, 1944
 Commissioned: January 11, 1945
 Shipyard: Deutsche Werft, Hamburg
Commander
 Hans-Dieter Wex
 Fate: Surrendered at Kristiansand Süd, Norway on May 9, 1945. Transferred to Loch Ryan, Scotland on May 29, 1945. Sunk by gunfire from British destroyer HMS Onslow on December 22, 1945, as part of Operation Deadlight.
 U-boat.net webpage for U-2354

Type: XXIII
Construction
 Laid Down: November 22, 1944
 Launched: January 18, 1945
 Commissioned: February 5, 1945
 Shipyard: Deutsche Werft, Hamburg
Commander
 Karl Frahm
 Fate: Surrendered at Kristiansand Süd, Norway on May 9, 1945. Transferred to Loch Ryan, Scotland on May 29, 1945. Sunk by gunfire from British destroyer HMS Onslow and Polish destroyer ORP Piorun on November 28, 1945, as part of Operation Deadlight.
 U-boat.net webpage for U-2363

Type: XXIII
Construction
 Laid Down: November 27, 1944
 Launched: January 23, 1945
 Commissioned: February 14, 1945
 Shipyard: Deutsche Werft, Hamburg
Commander
 Dieter Hengen
 Gerhard Remus
 Fate: Scuttled in Gelting Bay on May 5, 1945, as part of Operation Regenbogen. Later raised and broken up.
 U-boat.net webpage for U-2364

Type: XXIII
Construction
 Laid Down: December 6, 1944
 Launched: January 26, 1945
 Commissioned: March 2, 1945
 Shipyard: Deutsche Werft, Hamburg
Commander
 Fritz-Otto Korfmann
 Uwe Christiansen
 Fate: Scuttled in the Kattegat, northwest of Anholt island on May 8, 1945, as part of Operation Regenbogen. Raised in June 1956 and commissioned as West German submarine Hai on August 15, 1957. 
 U-boat.net webpage for U-2365

Type: XXIII
Construction
 Laid Down: December 6, 1944
 Launched: February 17, 1945
 Commissioned: March 10, 1945
 Shipyard: Deutsche Werft, Hamburg
Commander
 Kurt Jäckel
 Fate: Scuttled in Gelting Bay on May 3, 1945, as part of Operation Regenbogen. Later raised and broken up.
 U-boat.net webpage for U-2366

Type: XXIII
Construction
 Laid Down: December 11, 1944
 Launched: February 23, 1945
 Commissioned: March 17, 1945
 Shipyard: Deutsche Werft, Hamburg
Commander
 Heinrich Schröder
 Fate: Sank near Schleimünde on May 5, 1945, following a collision with another U-boat. Raised in August 1956 and commissioned as West German submarine Hecht on October 1, 1957.
 U-boat.net webpage for U-2367

Type: XXIII
Construction
 Laid Down: December 15, 1944
 Launched: March 29, 1945
 Commissioned: April 11, 1945
 Shipyard: Deutsche Werft, Hamburg
Commander
 Fritz Ufermann
 Fate: Scuttled in Gelting Bay on May 3, 1945, as part of Operation Regenbogen. Later raised and broken up.
 U-boat.net webpage for U-2368

Type: XXIII
Construction
 Laid Down: December 20, 1944
 Launched: March 24, 1945
 Commissioned: April 18, 1945
 Shipyard: Deutsche Werft, Hamburg
Commander
 Hermann Schulz
 Fate: Scuttled in Gelting Bay on May 3, 1945, as part of Operation Regenbogen. Later raised and broken up.
 U-boat.net webpage for U-2369

Type: XXIII
Construction
 Laid Down: December 20, 1944
 Launched: 
 Commissioned: 
 Shipyard: Deutsche Werft, Hamburg
Commander
 
 Fate: Some sources state U-2370 was commissioned on April 15, 1944. However, according to planned commander Oblt. Bornkesser the submarine was never commissioned and was scuttled unfinished on May 3, 1945, at the Fink II bunker in Hamburg.
 U-boat.net webpage for U-2370

Type: XXIII
Construction
 Laid Down: January 19, 1945
 Launched: April 18, 1945
 Commissioned: April 24, 1945
 Shipyard: Deutsche Werft, Hamburg
Commander
 Johannes Kühne
 Fate: Scuttled at Hamburg on May 3, 1945, as part of Operation Regenbogen. Later raised and broken up.
 U-boat.net webpage for U-2371

Type: XXIII
Construction
 Laid Down: June 1944
 Launched: 
 Commissioned: 
 Shipyard: Ansaldo, Genoa
Commander
 
 Fate: Keel laid down in June 1944, never completed. Cancelled August 24, 1944.
 U-boat.net webpage for U-2401

Type: XXIII
Construction
 Laid Down: June 1944
 Launched: 
 Commissioned: 
 Shipyard: Ansaldo, Genoa
Commander
 
 Fate: Keel laid down in June 1944, never completed. Cancelled August 24, 1944.
 U-boat.net webpage for U-2402

Type: XXIII
Construction
 Laid Down: July 1944
 Launched: 
 Commissioned: 
 Shipyard: Ansaldo, Genoa
Commander
 
 Fate: Keel laid down in July 1944, never completed. Cancelled August 24, 1944.
 U-boat.net webpage for U-2403

Type: XXIII
Construction
 Laid Down: July 1944
 Launched: 
 Commissioned: 
 Shipyard: Ansaldo, Genoa
Commander
 
 Fate: Keel laid down in July 1944, never completed. Cancelled August 24, 1944.
 U-boat.net webpage for U-2404

Type: XXIII
Construction
 Laid Down: June 12, 1944
 Launched: 
 Commissioned: 
 Shipyard: C.R.D.A, Monfalcone
Commander
 
 Fate: Never completed.
 U-boat.net webpage for U-2431

Type: XXIII
Construction
 Laid Down: June 16, 1944
 Launched: 
 Commissioned: 
 Shipyard: C.R.D.A, Monfalcone
Commander
 
 Fate: Never completed.
 U-boat.net webpage for U-2432

Type: XXI
Construction
 Laid Down: July 19, 1944
 Launched: September 19, 1944
 Commissioned: October 12, 1944
 Shipyard: Blohm & Voss, Hamburg
Commander
 Hans Bungards
 Erich Topp
 Fate: Surrendered at Horten, Norway on May 9, 1945. Transferred to Oslo on May 18, 1945. Departed Oslo on June 3, 1945, for Lisahally, Northern Ireland, arriving there on June 9. Secretly transferred to the US in August 1945 and escorted by USS Brant to New London, Connecticut, arriving there on August 25. Refitted at Portsmouth, New Hampshire and used for trials and training. Sunk west of Key West, Florida during rocket testing by USS Robert A. Owens on October 7, 1951.
 U-boat.net webpage for U-2513

Type: XXI
Construction
 Laid Down: August 16, 1944
 Launched: October 4, 1944
 Commissioned: November 4, 1944
 Shipyard: Blohm & Voss, Hamburg
Commander
 Friedrich Weidner
 Fate: Surrendered at Horten, Norway on May 9, 1945. Transferred to Oslo on May 18, 1945. Departed Oslo on June 3, 1945, for Lisahally, Northern Ireland, arriving there on June 7. Transferred to France on February 14, 1946, and renamed Roland Morillot on February 14, 1951.
 U-boat.net webpage for U-2518

Type: XXI
Construction
 Laid Down: September 29, 1944
 Launched: November 13, 1944
 Commissioned: February 22, 1945
 Shipyard: Blohm & Voss, Hamburg
Commander
 Karl-Heinrich Feufel
 Fritz Kallipke
 Fate: Surrendered at Kristiansand Süd, Norway on May 9, 1945. Departed Kristiansand on June 3, 1945, for Lisahally, Northern Ireland, arriving there on June 6. Allocated to the Soviet Union by the TNC. Arrived at Libau, Latvia on December 4, 1945, as British N-class N27. Allocated to the Soviet Baltic Fleet on February 13, 1946. Renamed B-27 on June 9, 1949, and transferred to reserve fleet on December 29, 1955. Redesignated as block ship BSh-28 on September 19, 1955, and as training hulk UTS-3 on January 9, 1957. Struck from Soviet Navy list on September 1, 1972, and broken up for scrap. 
 U-boat.net webpage for U-2529

Type: XXI
Construction
 Laid Down: October 10, 1944
 Launched: December 7, 1944
 Commissioned: 
 Shipyard: Blohm & Voss, Hamburg
Commander
 
 Fate: Sunk at yard during bombing raid on December 31, 1944, and again on January 17, 1945.
 U-boat.net webpage for U-2532

Type: XXI
Construction
 Laid Down: October 13, 1944
 Launched: December 7, 1944
 Commissioned: January 18, 1945
 Shipyard: Blohm & Voss, Hamburg
Commander 
 Horst Günther
 Fate: Scuttled at Travemünde on May 3, 1945. Later broken up.
 U-boat.net webpage for U-2533

Type: XXI
Construction
 Laid Down: October 23, 1944
 Launched: December 11, 1944
 Commissioned: January 17, 1945
 Shipyard: Blohm & Voss, Hamburg
Commander 
 Ulrich Drews
 Fate: Scuttled east of Fehmarn island on May 3, 1945. 
 U-boat.net webpage for U-2534

Type: XXI
Construction
 Laid Down: October 19, 1944
 Launched: December 16, 1944
 Commissioned: January 28, 1945
 Shipyard: Blohm & Voss, Hamburg
Commander 
 Otto Bitter
 Fate: Scuttled at Travemünde on May 3, 1945. Later raised and broken up.
 U-boat.net webpage for U-2535

Type: XXI
Construction
 Laid Down: October 21, 1944
 Launched: December 16, 1944
 Commissioned: February 6, 1945
 Shipyard: Blohm & Voss, Hamburg
Commander 
 Ulrich Vöge
 Fate: Scuttled at Travemünde on May 3, 1945. Later broken up.
 U-boat.net webpage for U-2536

Type: XXI
Construction
 Laid Down: October 10, 1944
 Launched: December 7, 1944
 Commissioned: 
 Shipyard: Blohm & Voss, Hamburg
Commander
 
 Fate: Sunk at yard during bombing raid on December 31, 1944.
 U-boat.net webpage for U-2537

Type: XXI
Construction
 Laid Down: October 24, 1944
 Launched: January 6, 1945
 Commissioned: February 16, 1945
 Shipyard: Blohm & Voss, Hamburg
Commander
 Heinrich Klapdor
 Fate: Scuttled off Ærø on May 3, 1945. Later raised and broken up in 1950.
 U-boat.net webpage for U-2538

Type: XXI
Construction
 Laid Down: October 27, 1944
 Launched: January 6, 1945
 Commissioned: February 21, 1945
 Shipyard: Blohm & Voss, Hamburg
Commander
 Erich Jewinski
 Fate: Scuttled at Kiel on May 3, 1945. Later raised and broken up.
 U-boat.net webpage for U-2539

Type: XXI
Construction
 Laid Down: November 22, 1944
 Launched: February 19, 1945
 Commissioned: March 21, 1945
 Shipyard: Blohm & Voss, Hamburg
Commander
 Max Dobbert
 Fate: Scuttled at Kiel on May 3, 1945. Later raised and broken up.
 U-boat.net webpage for U-2546

Type: XXI
Construction
 Laid Down: November 27, 1944
 Launched: March 9, 1945
 Commissioned: 
 Shipyard: Blohm & Voss, Hamburg
Commander
 
 Fate: Bombed while being built on March 11, 1945.
 U-boat.net webpage for U-2547

Type: XXI
Construction
 Laid Down: November 27, 1944
 Launched: March 9, 1945
 Commissioned: 
 Shipyard: Blohm & Voss, Hamburg
Commander
 Karl-Ernst Utischill
 Fate: Scuttled at Kiel on May 3, 1945, as part of Operation Regenbogen. Later raised and broken up.
 U-boat.net webpage for U-2548

Type: XXI
Construction
 Laid Down: November 27, 1944
 Launched: March 9, 1945
 Commissioned: 
 Shipyard: Blohm & Voss, Hamburg
Commander
 
 Fate: Bombed while being built on March 11, 1945.
 U-boat.net webpage for U-2549

Type: XXI
Construction
 Laid Down: November 27, 1944
 Launched: March 9, 1945
 Commissioned: 
 Shipyard: Blohm & Voss, Hamburg
Commander
 
 Fate: Bombed while being built on March 11, 1945.
 U-boat.net webpage for U-2550

Type: XXI
Construction
 Laid Down: December 8, 1944
 Launched: March 31, 1945
 Commissioned: April 24, 1945
 Shipyard: Blohm & Voss, Hamburg
Commander
  Gerhard Schaar
 Fate: Deliberately run aground by its crew at Solitüde Spit near Flensburg on May 5, 1945. Blown up by the Royal Navy on May 23, 1945, and then broken up.
 U-boat.net webpage for U-2551

Type: XXI
Construction
 Laid Down: December 10, 1944
 Launched: March 31, 1945
 Commissioned: April 21, 1945
 Shipyard: Blohm & Voss, Hamburg
Commander
 Johannes Rudolph
 Fate: Scuttled in Kiel harbor southwest of buoy B2 on May 3, 1945, as part of Operation Regenbogen. Later raised and broken up.
 U-boat.net webpage for U-2552

Type: XXI
Construction
 Laid Down: December 12, 1944
 Launched: 
 Commissioned: 
 Shipyard: Blohm & Voss, Hamburg
Commander
 
 Fate: Still unfinished at the end of the war, broken up on stocks in 1945-1946.
 U-boat.net webpage for U-2553

Type: XXI
Construction
 Laid Down: December 14, 1944
 Launched: 
 Commissioned: 
 Shipyard: Blohm & Voss, Hamburg
Commander
 
 Fate: Still unfinished at the end of the war, broken up on stocks in 1945-1946.
 U-boat.net webpage for U-2554

Type: XXI
Construction
 Laid Down: December 20, 1944
 Launched: 
 Commissioned: 
 Shipyard: Blohm & Voss, Hamburg
Commander
 
 Fate: Still unfinished at the end of the war, broken up on stocks in 1945-1946.
 U-boat.net webpage for U-2555

Type: XXI
Construction
 Laid Down: December 23, 1944
 Launched: 
 Commissioned: 
 Shipyard: Blohm & Voss, Hamburg
Commander
 
 Fate: Still unfinished at the end of the war, broken up on stocks in 1945-1946.
 U-boat.net webpage for U-2556

Type: XXI
Construction
 Laid Down: December 30, 1944
 Launched: 
 Commissioned: 
 Shipyard: Blohm & Voss, Hamburg
Commander
 
 Fate: Still unfinished at the end of the war, broken up on stocks in 1945-1946.
 U-boat.net webpage for U-2557

Type: XXI
Construction
 Laid Down: February 1, 1945
 Launched: 
 Commissioned: 
 Shipyard: Blohm & Voss, Hamburg
Commander
 
 Fate: Still unfinished at the end of the war, broken up on stocks in 1945-1946.
 U-boat.net webpage for U-2558

Type: XXI
Construction
 Laid Down: February 4, 1945
 Launched: 
 Commissioned: 
 Shipyard: Blohm & Voss, Hamburg
Commander
 
 Fate: Still unfinished at the end of the war, broken up on stocks in 1945-1946.
 U-boat.net webpage for U-2559

Type: XXI
Construction
 Laid Down: February 12, 1945
 Launched: 
 Commissioned: 
 Shipyard: Blohm & Voss, Hamburg
Commander
 
 Fate: Still unfinished at the end of the war, broken up on stocks in 1945-1946.
 U-boat.net webpage for U-2560

Type: XXI
Construction
 Laid Down: February 15, 1945
 Launched: 
 Commissioned: 
 Shipyard: Blohm & Voss, Hamburg
Commander
 
 Fate: Still unfinished at the end of the war, broken up on stocks in 1945-1946.
 U-boat.net webpage for U-2561

Type: XXI
Construction
 Laid Down: February 24, 1945
 Launched: 
 Commissioned: 
 Shipyard: Blohm & Voss, Hamburg
Commander
 
 Fate: Still unfinished at the end of the war, broken up on stocks in 1945-1946.
 U-boat.net webpage for U-2562

Type: XXI
Construction
 Laid Down: February 28, 1945
 Launched: 
 Commissioned: 
 Shipyard: Blohm & Voss, Hamburg
Commander
 
 Fate: Still unfinished at the end of the war, broken up on stocks in 1945-1946.
 U-boat.net webpage for U-2563

Type: XXI
Construction
 Laid Down: March 29, 1945
 Launched: 
 Commissioned: 
 Shipyard: Blohm & Voss, Hamburg
Commander
 
 Fate: Still unfinished at the end of the war, broken up on stocks in 1945-1946.
 U-boat.net webpage for U-2564

Type: XXI
Construction
 Laid Down: April 15, 1944
 Launched: May 30, 1944
 Commissioned: July 20, 1944
 Shipyard: AG Weser, Bremen
Commander
 Hans Vogel
 Fate: Scuttled northwest of Wesermünde on May 3, 1945. Later raised and broken up.
 U-boat.net webpage for U-3001

Type: XXI
Construction
 Laid Down: September 2, 1944
 Launched: November 5, 1944
 Commissioned: January 5, 1945
 Shipyard: AG Weser, Bremen
Commander
 Rolf Lindschau
 Fate: Surrendered at Horten, Norway on May 9, 1945. Transferred to Oslo on May 18. Left Oslo on June 3, 1945, for Lisahally, Northern Ireland, arriving there on June 7. Transferred to Britain and commissioned as British submarine N41.
 U-boat.net webpage for U-3041

Type: XXI
Construction
 Laid Down: November 11, 1944
 Launched: January 24, 1945
 Commissioned: March 1, 1945
 Shipyard: AG Weser, Bremen
Commander
 Ernst-August Gerke
 Fate: Surrendered at Stavanger, Norway on May 9, 1945. Left Stavanger on May 31, 1945, for Scapa Flow, Scotland, arriving there on June 2. Left Scapa Flow the same day for Lisahally, Northern Ireland, arriving there on June 4. Allocated by the TNC to the Soviet Union. Arrived at Libau, Latvia on December 10, 1945, as British N-class N28. Allocated to the Soviet Baltic Fleet on February 13, 1946, and renamed B-28 on June 9, 1949. Transferred to reserve on December 29, 1955. Redesignated as floating submarine battery recharging station PZS-34 on January 18, 1956. Struck from Soviet Navy list on March 25, 1958, and broken up for scrap.
 U-boat.net webpage for U-3041

Type: XXI
Construction
 Laid Down: November 22, 1944
 Launched: January 27, 1945
 Commissioned: 
 Shipyard: AG Weser, Bremen
Commander
 
 Fate: Sunk during air raid on March 30, 1945, while being fitted out.
 U-boat.net webpage for U-3036

Type: XXI
Construction
 Laid Down: December 7, 1944
 Launched: February 15, 1945
 Commissioned: March 10, 1945
 Shipyard: AG Weser, Bremen
Commander
 Joachim Vieth
 Hans Hornkohl
 Fate: Surrendered at Horten, Norway on May 9, 1945. Transferred to Oslo on May 18. Left Oslo on June 3, 1945, for Lisahally, Northern Ireland, arriving there on June 7. Allocated by the TNC to the Soviet Union. Arrived at Libau, Latvia on December 10, 1945, as British N-class N29. Allocated to the Soviet Baltic Fleet on February 13, 1946, and renamed B-29 on June 9, 1949. Transferred to reserve on December 29, 1955. Redesignated as floating submarine battery recharging station PZS-31 on January 18, 1956. Struck from Soviet Navy list on September 28, 1958, and broken up for scrap.
 U-boat.net webpage for U-3041

Type: XXI
Construction
 Laid Down: December 15, 1944
 Launched: 
 Commissioned: 
 Shipyard: AG Weser, Bremen
Commander
 
 Fate: Damaged in air raid while on slipways on February 22, 1945.
 U-boat.net webpage for U-3042

Type: XXI
Construction
 Laid Down: December 14, 1944
 Launched: 
 Commissioned: 
 Shipyard: AG Weser, Bremen
Commander
 
 Fate: Damaged in air raid while on slipways on February 22, 1945.
 U-boat.net webpage for U-3043

Type: XXI
Construction
 Laid Down: December 21, 1944
 Launched: March 1, 1945
 Commissioned: March 27, 1945
 Shipyard: AG Weser, Bremen
Commander
 Bernhard Jaek
 Detlef von Lehsten
 Fate: Scuttled in Gelting Bay on May 5, 1945, as part of Operation Regenbogen. Later raised and broken up.
 U-boat.net webpage for U-3044

Type: XXI
Construction
 Laid Down: December 20, 1944
 Launched: March 6, 1945
 Commissioned: 
 Shipyard: AG Weser, Bremen
Commander
 
 Fate: Sunk during air raid on March 30, 1945, while being fitted out.
 U-boat.net webpage for U-3045

Type: XXI
Construction
 Laid Down: December 29, 1944
 Launched: March 10, 1945
 Commissioned: 
 Shipyard: AG Weser, Bremen
Commander
 
 Fate: Sunk during air raid on March 30, 1945, while being fitted out.
 U-boat.net webpage for U-3046

Type: XXI
Construction
 Laid Down: January 3, 1945
 Launched: April 11, 1945
 Commissioned: 
 Shipyard: AG Weser, Bremen
Commander
 
 Fate: Broken up because it was not ready for commission.
 U-boat.net webpage for U-3047

Type: XXI
Construction
 Laid Down: December 31, 1944
 Launched: 
 Commissioned: 
 Shipyard: AG Weser, Bremen
Commander
 
 Fate: Broken up because it was not ready for commission.
 U-boat.net webpage for U-3048

Type: XXI
Construction
 Laid Down: December 30, 1944
 Launched: 
 Commissioned: 
 Shipyard: AG Weser, Bremen
Commander
 
 Fate: Broken up because it was not ready for commission.
 U-boat.net webpage for U-3049

Type: XXI
Construction
 Laid Down: January 9, 1945
 Launched: April 18, 1945
 Commissioned: 
 Shipyard: AG Weser, Bremen
Commander
 
 Fate: Broken up because it was not ready for commission.
 U-boat.net webpage for U-3050

Type: XXI
Construction
 Laid Down: January 8, 1945
 Launched: April 20, 1945
 Commissioned: 
 Shipyard: AG Weser, Bremen
Commander
 
 Fate: Broken up because it was not ready for commission.
 U-boat.net webpage for U-3051

Type: XXI
Construction
 Laid Down: January 22, 1945
 Launched: 
 Commissioned: 
 Shipyard: AG Weser, Bremen
Commander
 
 Fate: Broken up on slipways.
 U-boat.net webpage for U-3052

Type: XXI
Construction
 Laid Down: January 25, 1945
 Launched: 
 Commissioned: 
 Shipyard: AG Weser, Bremen
Commander
 
 Fate: Broken up on slipways.
 U-boat.net webpage for U-3053

Type: XXI
Construction
 Laid Down: January 27, 1945
 Launched: 
 Commissioned: 
 Shipyard: AG Weser, Bremen
Commander
 
 Fate: Damaged in air raid on March 11, 1945. Broken up on slipways.
 U-boat.net webpage for U-3054

Type: XXI
Construction
 Laid Down: January 25, 1945
 Launched: 
 Commissioned: 
 Shipyard: AG Weser, Bremen
Commander
 
 Fate: Broken up on slipways.
 U-boat.net webpage for U-3055

Type: XXI
Construction
 Laid Down: February 7, 1945
 Launched: 
 Commissioned: 
 Shipyard: AG Weser, Bremen
Commander
 
 Fate: Broken up on slipways.
 U-boat.net webpage for U-3056

Type: XXI
Construction
 Laid Down: February 4, 1945
 Launched: 
 Commissioned: 
 Shipyard: AG Weser, Bremen
Commander
 
 Fate: Broken up on slipways.
 U-boat.net webpage for U-3057

Type: XXI
Construction
 Laid Down: February 17, 1945
 Launched: 
 Commissioned: 
 Shipyard: AG Weser, Bremen
Commander
 
 Fate: Broken up on slipways.
 U-boat.net webpage for U-3058

Type: XXI
Construction
 Laid Down: February 15, 1945
 Launched: 
 Commissioned: 
 Shipyard: AG Weser, Bremen
Commander
 
 Fate: Broken up on slipways.
 U-boat.net webpage for U-3059

Type: XXI
Construction
 Laid Down: February 25, 1945
 Launched: 
 Commissioned: 
 Shipyard: AG Weser, Bremen
Commander
 
 Fate: Broken up on slipways.
 U-boat.net webpage for U-3060

Type: XXI
Construction
 Laid Down: February 24, 1945
 Launched: 
 Commissioned: 
 Shipyard: AG Weser, Bremen
Commander
 
 Fate: Damaged in air raid on March 11, 1945. Broken up on slipways.
 U-boat.net webpage for U-3061

Type: XXI
Construction
 Laid Down: March 9, 1945
 Launched: 
 Commissioned: 
 Shipyard: AG Weser, Bremen
Commander
 
 Fate: Broken up on slipways.
 U-boat.net webpage for U-3062

Type: XXI
Construction
 Laid Down: March 7, 1945
 Launched: 
 Commissioned: 
 Shipyard: AG Weser, Bremen
Commander
 
 Fate: Broken up on slipways.
 U-boat.net webpage for U-3063

Type: XXI
Construction
 Laid Down: March 20, 1944
 Launched: April 19, 1944
 Commissioned: July 29, 1944
 Shipyard: Schichau-Werke, Danzig
Commander
 Helmut Münster
 Hans-Joachim Schmidt-Weichert
 Fate: Scuttled in the west side of the Weser estuary on May 5 (or May 1), 1945. Later broken up.
 U-boat.net webpage for U-3501

Type: XXI
Construction
 Laid Down: April 16, 1944
 Launched: July 6, 1944
 Commissioned: August 19, 1944
 Shipyard: Schichau-Werke, Danzig
Commander
 Hermann Schultz
 Fate: Used as an electricity-producing boat; stern damaged by bombs and was removed from service at Hamburg on May 3, 1945. Later broken up.
 U-boat.net webpage for U-3502

Type: XXI
Construction
 Laid Down: June 17, 1944
 Launched: July 27, 1944
 Commissioned: September 9, 1944
 Shipyard: Schichau-Werke, Danzig
Commander
 Hugo Deiring
 Fate: Scuttled in the Kattegat, west of Göteborg, Sweden on May 8, 1945. Raised in 1946 and broken up.
 U-boat.net webpage for U-3503

Type: XXI
Construction
 Laid Down: June 30, 1944
 Launched: August 15, 1944
 Commissioned: September 23, 1944
 Shipyard: Schichau-Werke, Danzig
Commander
 Kart-Hartwig Siebold
 Fate: Scuttled at Wilhelmshaven on May 2, 1945. Later broken up.
 U-boat.net webpage for U-3504

Type: XXI
Construction
 Laid Down: July 9, 1944
 Launched: August 25, 1944
 Commissioned: October 7, 1944
 Shipyard: Schichau-Werke, Danzig
Commander
 Horst Willner
 Fate: Sunk by bombs at Kiel on April 3, 1945. Wreck later broken up.
 U-boat.net webpage for U-3505

Type: XXI
Construction
 Laid Down: July 14, 1944
 Launched: August 28, 1944
 Commissioned: October 16, 1944
 Shipyard: Schichau-Werke, Danzig
Commander
 Gerhard Thäter
 Fate: Scuttled in the Elbe II bunker at Hamburg on May 2, 1945, and not discovered until 1985. Wreckage still there, but covered in gravel. A parking lot now sits on top of the bunker site.
 U-boat.net webpage for U-3506

Type: XXI
Construction
 Laid Down: July 19, 1944
 Launched: September 16, 1944
 Commissioned: October 19, 1944
 Shipyard: Schichau-Werke, Danzig
Commander
 Otto Niethmann
 Hans-Jürgen Schley
 Fate: Scuttled at Travemünde on May 3, 1945. Later broken up.
 U-boat.net webpage for U-3507

Type: XXI
Construction
 Laid Down: July 25, 1944
 Launched: September 22, 1944
 Commissioned: November 2, 1944
 Shipyard: Schichau-Werke, Danzig
Commander
 Detlef von Lehsten
 Fate: Sunk whilst empty in Wilhelmshaven by an Eighth Air Force raid on March 3, 1945. It was raised by engineers, but sunk again on March 30, 1945.
 U-boat.net webpage for U-3508

Type: XXI
Construction
 Laid Down: July 19, 1944
 Launched: September 27, 1944
 Commissioned: January 29, 1945
 Shipyard: Schichau-Werke, Danzig
Commanders
 Hans Hornkohl
 Karl-Hein Vosswinkel
 Heinz Franke
 Wilhelm Neitzsch
 Fate: Scuttled at Wesermünde near Bremerhaven, May 3, 1945
 U-boat.net webpage for U-3509

Type: XXI
Construction
 Laid Down: August 6, 1944
 Launched: October 4, 1944
 Commissioned: November 11, 1944
 Shipyard: Schichau-Werke, Danzig
Commander
 Ernst-Werner Schwirley
 Fate: Scuttled in Geltinger Bay, May 4, 1945
 U-boat.net webpage for U-3510

Type: XXI
Construction
 Laid Down: August 14, 1944
 Launched: October 11, 1944
 Commissioned: November 18, 1944
 Shipyard: Schichau-Werke, Danzig
Commander
 Martin Grasse
 Hans-Heinrich Ketels
 Hermann Schrenk
 Fate: Scuttled at Travemünde near Neustadt, May 3, 1945
 U-boat.net webpage for U-3511

Type: XXI
Construction
 Laid Down: August 15, 1944
 Launched: October 11, 1944
 Commissioned: November 27, 1944
 Shipyard: Schichau-Werke, Danzig
Commander
 Hans Hornkohl
 Fate: Destroyed by Royal Air Force bombers whilst laid up empty in Kiel, 9 April 1945
 U-boat.net webpage for U-3512

Type: XXI
Construction
 Laid Down: August 20, 1944
 Launched: October 21, 1944
 Commissioned: December 2, 1944
 Shipyard: Schichau-Werke, Danzig
Commander
 Otto-Heinrich Nachtigall
 Fate: Scuttled at Travemünde near Neustadt, May 3, 1945
 U-boat.net webpage for U-3513

Type: XXI
Construction
 Laid Down: August 21, 1944
 Launched: October 21, 1944
 Commissioned: December 9, 1944
 Shipyard: Schichau-Werke, Danzig
Commander
 Günther Fritze
 Fate: Captured at Bergen, Norway and transported to Loch Ryan awaiting a decision about its fate. The Soviet Union refused an offer to have it, as did Britain, so on the 11 February 1946 it was sunk by the naval tug Prosperous with gunfire and a "Shark" anti-submarine weapon. U-3514 was the last submarine to be disposed of in Operation Deadlight.
 U-boat.net webpage for U-3514

Type: XXI
Construction
 Laid Down: August 27, 1944
 Launched: November 4, 1944
 Commissioned: December 14, 1944
 Shipyard: Schichau-Werke, Danzig
Commander
 Fedor Kuscher
 Fate: Surrendered at Horten, Norway on May 9, 1945. Transferred to Oslo on May 18, to Scapa Flow, Scotland on June 3, 1945, arriving there on June 6, and finally to Lisahally, Northern Ireland on June 8, 1945, arriving there on June 9. Allocated to the Soviet Union by the TNC. Arrived at Libau, Latvia on February 2, 1946, as British N-class N30. Allocated to the Soviet Baltic Fleet on February 13, 1946. Renamed B-30 on June 9, 1949, and transferred to reserve fleet on December 29, 1955. Redesignated as floating submarine battery recharging station PZS-35 on January 18, 1956, and as test hulk B-100 on July 2, 1958. Struck from Soviet Navy list on September 25, 1959, and broken up for scrap on November 30, 1959. 
 U-boat.net webpage for U-3515

Type: XXI
Construction
 Laid Down: Summer 1944
 Launched: November 4, 1944
 Commissioned: December 18, 1944
 Shipyard: Schichau-Werke, Danzig
Commander
 Hans Wengel
 Heinrich Grote
 Fate: Scuttled at Travemünde near Neustadt, May 2, 1945. Later raised and broken up.
 U-boat.net webpage for U-3516

Type: XXI
Construction
 Laid Down: September 12, 1944
 Launched: December 6, 1944
 Commissioned: December 22, 1944
 Shipyard: Schichau-Werke, Danzig
Commander
 Helmuth Münster
 Fate: Scuttled at Travemünde near Neustadt, May 4, 1945
 U-boat.net webpage for U-3517

Type: XXI
Construction
 Laid Down: September 12, 1944
 Launched: December 11, 1944
 Commissioned: December 29, 1944
 Shipyard: Schichau-Werke, Danzig
Commander
 Herbert Brünning
 Fate: Scuttled in Kiel harbour, May 3, 1945
 U-boat.net webpage for U-3518

Type: XXI
Construction
 Laid Down: September 19, 1944
 Launched: November 23, 1944
 Commissioned: January 6, 1945
 Shipyard: Schichau-Werke, Danzig
Commander
 Richard von Harpe
 Fate: Sunk with all hands by an RAF air-dropped mine during training north of Warnemünde on March 2, 1945.
 U-boat.net webpage for U-3519

Type: XXI
Construction
 Laid Down: September 20, 1944
 Launched: November 23, 1944
 Commissioned: January 12, 1945
 Shipyard: Schichau-Werke, Danzig
Commander
 Sarto Ballert
 Fate: Sunk with all hands during training northeast of Bülk by mines on January 31, 1945.
 U-boat.net webpage for U-3520

Type: XXI
Construction
 Laid Down: October 3, 1944
 Launched: December 3, 1944
 Commissioned: January 14, 1945
 Shipyard: Schichau-Werke, Danzig
Commander
 Günther Keller
 Fate: Scuttled at Travemünde near Neustadt, May 2, 1945
 U-boat.net webpage for U-3521

Type: XXI
Construction
 Laid Down: October 1944
 Launched: December 3, 1944
 Commissioned: January 21, 1945
 Shipyard: Schichau-Werke, Danzig
Commander
 Diether Lenzmann
 Fate: Scuttled at Travemünde near Neustadt, May 2, 1945
 U-boat.net webpage for U-3522

Type: XXI
Construction
 Laid Down: October 7, 1944
 Launched: December 14, 1944
 Commissioned: January 23, 1945
 Shipyard: Schichau-Werke, Danzig
Commander
 Willi Müller
 Fate: Sunk during training with all hands by depth charges from a B-24 Liberator of RAF 86 Squadron in the Skagerrak northeast of Skagen Horn on May 6, 1945. Wreckage found in April 2018.
 U-boat.net webpage for U-3523

Type: XXI
Construction
 Laid Down: October 1944
 Launched: December 14, 1944
 Commissioned: January 26, 1945
 Shipyard: Schichau-Werke, Danzig
Commander
 Hans-Ludwig Witt
 Fate: Scuttled in Flensburger Förde, May 4, 1945
 U-boat.net webpage for U-3524

Type: XXI
Construction
 Laid Down: October 17, 1944
 Launched: December 23, 1944
 Commissioned: January 31, 1945
 Shipyard: Schichau-Werke, Danzig
Commanders
 Hans-Ludwig Gaude
 Franz Kranich
 Fate: Severely damaged by an air raid on Kiel, the wreckage was scuttled on May 3, 1945
 U-boat.net webpage for U-3525

Type: XXI
Construction
 Laid Down: October 15, 1944
 Launched: December 23, 1944
 Commissioned: March 22, 1945
 Shipyard: Schichau-Werke, Danzig
Commander
 Kurt Hilbig
 Fate: Scuttled in the mouth of the Weser River at Wesermünde, May 4, 1945
 U-boat.net webpage for U-3526

Type: XXI
Construction
 Laid Down: October 25, 1944
 Launched: January 10, 1945
 Commissioned: March 10, 1945
 Shipyard: Schichau-Werke, Danzig
Commander
 Willy Kronenbitter
 Fate: Scuttled in the mouth of the Weser River at Wesermünde, May 4, 1945
 U-boat.net webpage for U-3527

Type: XXI
Construction
 Laid Down: October 26, 1944
 Launched: January 10, 1945
 Commissioned: March 18, 1945
 Shipyard: Schichau-Werke, Danzig
Commander
 Heinz Zwarg
 Fate: Scuttled in the mouth of the Weser River at Wesermünde, May 4, 1945. Later raised and broken up.
 U-boat.net webpage for U-3528

Type: XXI
Construction
 Laid Down: November 2, 1944
 Launched: January 26, 1945
 Commissioned: March 22, 1945
 Shipyard: Schichau-Werke, Danzig
Commander
 Karl-Heinz Schmidt
 Fate: Scuttled in Flensburger Förde, May 5, 1945. Later raised and broken up.
 U-boat.net webpage for U-3529

Type: XXI
Construction
 Laid Down: November 3, 1944
 Launched: January 26, 1945
 Commissioned: March 23, 1945
 Shipyard: Schichau-Werke, Danzig
Commanders
 Wilhelm Brauel
 Walter-Ernst Koch
 Fate: Scuttled in Kiel harbour, May 3, 1945. Later raised and broken up.
 U-boat.net webpage for U-3530

Type: XXI
Construction
 Laid Down: November 9, 1944
 Launched: February 3, 1945
 Commissioned: 
 Shipyard: Schichau-Werke, Danzig
Commander
 Fate: Nearly finished, towed to Wesermunde and broken up.
 U-boat.net webpage for U-3531

Type: XXI
Construction
 Laid Down: November 9, 1944
 Launched: February 3, 1945
 Commissioned: 
 Shipyard: Schichau-Werke, Danzig
Commander
 Fate: Nearly finished, towed to Wesermunde and broken up.
 U-boat.net webpage for U-3532

Type: XXI
Construction
 Laid Down: November 16, 1944
 Launched: February 14, 1945
 Commissioned: 
 Shipyard: Schichau-Werke, Danzig
Commander
 Fate: Nearly finished, towed to Wesermunde and broken up.
 U-boat.net webpage for U-3533

Type: XXI
Construction
 Laid Down: November 17, 1944
 Launched: February 14, 1945
 Commissioned: 
 Shipyard: Schichau-Werke, Danzig
Commander
 Fate: Nearly finished, towed to Wesermunde and broken up.
 U-boat.net webpage for U-3534

Type: XXI
Construction
 Laid Down: November 26, 1944
 Launched:
 Commissioned: 
 Shipyard: Schichau-Werke, Danzig
Commander
 Fate: Captured incomplete by the Soviets on Slip No. 4 on March 30, 1945, was 95% complete for launching when captured. Redesignated as TS-5 on April 12, 1945, and launched at Danzig in July 1945. Allocated to Soviet Baltic Fleet and moved to Libau, Latvia. Inspected by TNC at Libau on October 8, 1945, still incomplete and with a missing rudder. Moved to Kronstadt in early 1945 or early 1946 and probably commissioned into the Soviet Navy for sea trials/training. Renamed R-1 on March 8, 1947. Sunk in the Baltic off Cape Ristna Lighthouse on August 7 or 8, 1947.
 U-boat.net webpage for U-3535

Type: XXI
Construction
 Laid Down: November 27, 1944
 Launched:
 Commissioned: 
 Shipyard: Schichau-Werke, Danzig
Commander
 Fate: Captured incomplete by the Soviets on Slip No. 4 on March 30, 1945, was 95% complete for launching when captured. Redesignated as TS-6 on April 12, 1945, and launched at Danzig in July 1945. Allocated to Soviet Baltic Fleet and moved to Libau, Latvia. Inspected by TNC at Libau on October 8, 1945, still incomplete and with a missing rudder. Moved to Kronstadt in early 1945 or early 1946 and probably commissioned into the Soviet Navy for sea trials/training. Renamed R-2 on March 8, 1947. Sunk in the Baltic off Cape Ristna Lighthouse on August 7 or 8, 1947.
 U-boat.net webpage for U-3536

Type: XXI
Construction
 Laid Down: December 20, 1944
 Launched:
 Commissioned: 
 Shipyard: Schichau-Werke, Danzig
Commander
 Fate: Captured incomplete by the Soviets on Slip No. 3 on March 30, 1945. Redesignated as TS-7 on April 12, 1945, and launched at Danzig in mid-1945. Allocated to Soviet Baltic Fleet and moved to Libau, Latvia. Inspected by TNC at Libau on October 8, 1945, still incomplete. Moved to Kronstadt in early 1945 or early 1946 and probably commissioned into the Soviet Navy for sea trials/training. Renamed R-3 on March 8, 1947. Sunk in the Baltic off Cape Ristna Lighthouse on August 7 or 8, 1947.
 U-boat.net webpage for U-3537

Type: XXI
Construction
 Laid Down: 
 Launched:
 Commissioned: 
 Shipyard: Schichau-Werke, Danzig
Commander
 Fate: Construction suspended on January 29, 1945. Captured incomplete by the Soviets on Slip No. 3 on March 30, 1945. Redesignated as TS-8 on April 12, 1945, and launched at Danzig in July 1945. Allocated to Soviet Baltic Fleet and moved to Libau, Latvia. Inspected by TNC at Libau on October 8, 1945, still incomplete with bomb damage and a flooded forward section. Moved to Kronstadt in early 1945 or early 1946. Renamed R-4 on March 8, 1947. Struck off Soviet Navy list on February 28, 1948, and released for recovery, later broken up for scrap.
 U-boat.net webpage for U-3538

Type: XXI
Construction
 Laid Down: 
 Launched:
 Commissioned: 
 Shipyard: Schichau-Werke, Danzig
Commander
 Fate: Construction suspended on January 29, 1945. Captured incomplete by the Soviets on Slip No. 2 on March 30, 1945. Redesignated as TS-9 on April 12, 1945, and launched at Danzig in July 1945. Allocated to Soviet Baltic Fleet and moved to Libau, Latvia and then to Tallinn, Estonia, still incomplete. Moved to Kronstadt in early 1945 or early 1946. Renamed R-5 on March 8, 1947. Struck off Soviet Navy list on February 29, 1948, and released for recovery, later broken up for scrap.
 U-boat.net webpage for U-3539

Type: XXI
Construction
 Laid Down: 
 Launched:
 Commissioned: 
 Shipyard: Schichau-Werke, Danzig
Commander
 Fate: Construction suspended on January 29, 1945. Captured incomplete by the Soviets on Slip No. 2 on March 30, 1945. Redesignated as TS-10 on April 12, 1945, and launched at Danzig in July 1945. Allocated to Soviet Baltic Fleet and moved to Libau, Latvia. Inspected by TNC at Libau on October 8, 1945, still incomplete and with a missing rudder. Moved to Kronstadt in early 1945 or early 1946. Renamed R-6 on March 8, 1947. Struck off Soviet Navy list on February 28, 1948, and released for recovery, later broken up for scrap.
 U-boat.net webpage for U-3540

Type: XXI
Construction
 Laid Down: 
 Launched:
 Commissioned: 
 Shipyard: Schichau-Werke, Danzig
Commander
 Fate: Construction suspended on January 29, 1945. Captured incomplete by the Soviets on Slip No. 6 on March 30, 1945. Redesignated as TS-11 on April 12, 1945, and launched at Danzig in July 1945. Allocated to Soviet Baltic Fleet and moved to Libau, Latvia and then to Tallinn, Estonia, still incomplete. Moved to Kronstadt in early 1945 or early 1946. Renamed R-7 on March 8, 1947. Struck off Soviet Navy list on February 28, 1948, and released for recovery, later broken up for scrap.
 U-boat.net webpage for U-3541

Type: XXI
Construction
 Laid Down: 
 Launched:
 Commissioned: 
 Shipyard: Schichau-Werke, Danzig
Commander
 Fate: Construction suspended on January 29, 1945. Captured incomplete by the Soviets on Slip No. 3 on March 30, 1945. Redesignated as TS-12 on April 12, 1945, and launched at Danzig in July 1945. Allocated to Soviet Baltic Fleet and moved to Libau, Latvia. Inspected by TNC at Libau on October 8, 1945, still incomplete. Moved to Kronstadt in early 1945 or early 1946. Renamed R-8 on March 8, 1947. Struck off Soviet Navy list on February 28, 1948, and released for recovery, later broken up for scrap.
 U-boat.net webpage for U-3542

Type: XXIII
Construction
 Laid Down: November 14, 1944
 Launched: January 19, 1945
 Commissioned: February 7, 1945
 Shipyard: Germaniawerft, Kiel
Commander
 Manfred Schneider
 Fate: Surrendered at Kristiansand Süd, Norway on May 9, 1945. Transferred to Norway in October 1948 and became the Norwegian submarine KNM Knerter.
 U-boat.net webpage for U-4706

Type: XXIII
Construction
 Laid Down: December 1, 1944
 Launched: March 24, 1945
 Commissioned: 
 Shipyard: Germaniawerft, Kiel
Commander
 
 Fate: Sunk just prior to commissioning on April 9, 1945, in the Kilian bunker in Kiel. Rumored to be still there in early 2000.
 U-boat.net webpage for U-4708

References

U-boat.net: U-boats database

 
Lists of submarines
German military-related lists
Lists of World War II ships
Germany in World War II-related lists